Intuit is an album by the American jazz guitarist Kurt Rosenwinkel.

Track listing

Personnel
 Kurt Rosenwinkel – guitar
 Michael Kanan – piano
 Joe Martin – double bass
 Tim Pleasant – drums

References

1999 albums
Criss Cross Jazz albums
Kurt Rosenwinkel albums